Arnold Bugár (born 2 September 1971) is a Slovak gymnast. He competed in seven events at the 1992 Summer Olympics.

References

1971 births
Living people
Slovak male artistic gymnasts
Olympic gymnasts of Czechoslovakia
Gymnasts at the 1992 Summer Olympics
Sportspeople from Bratislava